Euchrysops severini is a butterfly in the family Lycaenidae. It is found in the eastern part of the Democratic Republic of the Congo, western Tanzania, Uganda, Kenya and Ethiopia. The habitat consists of savanna.

References

Butterflies described in 1924
Euchrysops